Bissext, or bissextus is the 'leap day' which is added to the  Julian calendar and the Gregorian calendar every fourth year to compensate for the six-hour difference in length between the common 365-day year and the actual length of the solar year.  (The Gregorian calendar omits this leap day in years evenly divisible by 100, unless they are divisible by 400.)

In the Julian calendar, 24 February i.e. the 6th day before the calends (1st) of March, counting backwards inclusively in the Roman style (1/3, 28/2, 27/2, 26/2, 25/2, 24/2) was doubled in a leap year. In modern usage, with the exception of some ecclesiastical calendars, this intercalary day is added for convenience at the end of the month of February, as 29 February, and years in which February has 29 days are called "bissextile," or leap years.

Replacement (by 29 February) of the awkward practice of having two days with the same date appears to have evolved by custom and practice. In the course of the fifteenth century, "29 February" appears increasingly often in legal documents although the records of the proceedings of the House of Commons of England continued to use the old system until the middle of the sixteenth century. It was not until passage of the Calendar (New Style) Act 1750 that 29 February was formally recognised in British law.

Bisextile
Section II of the Calendar (New Style) Act 1750 uses the word "bissextile" as a term for leap years.

Notes

References

Further reading

Julian calendar